David Gordon John Roberts (born 2 December 1937) is an Australian professor of German studies. He was awarded a Ph.D at Monash University in 1968, supervised by Leslie Bodi.
His main areas of research are modern German literature, socio-aesthetics of literature and the arts, and the aesthetic theory and cultural history of European modernism.

Awards 
 Fellowship, Alexander von Humboldt Foundation 1969, 1981, 1997
 Fellow of the Australian Academy of the Humanities 1986- 
 Centennial Medal for Service to German Studies in Australia 2001

Editorial activities 
 Co-editor Thesis Eleven. Critical Theory and Historical Sociology 1983-
 International Advisory Board, Germanistik 1987-
 International Editorial Board, The German Quarterly 1988-1994
 Co-editor, “Monash European Studies”, Berg Publishers, Oxford/New York/Hamburg, 1988–1993
 International Advisory Board, “Studies in Contemporary German Literature”, Stauffenburg, Tübingen, 1997–2002
 Advisory Board, Limbus. Australian Yearbook of German Literary and Cultural Studies

Publications 
 Artistic Consciousness and Political Conscience: The Novels of Heinrich Mann 1900-1938. Bern, Lang, 1971(Australian and New Zealand Studies in German Language and Literature 2)
 Kopf und Welt: Elias Canettis Roman “Die Blendung”. München, Hanser Verlag, 1975 (“Literatur als Kunst”, ed. Walter Höllerer)
 The Indirections of Desire. Hamlet in Goethes Wilhelm Meister. Heidelberg, Carl Winter Verlag, 1980 (“Reihe Siegen”, ed. Helmut Kreuzer & Karl Riha
 Art and Enlightenment: Aesthetic Theory after Adorno. Lincoln, London, University of Nebraska Press, 1991 (Modern German Culture and Literature, ed. Peter Uwe Hohendahl) . Reissued as paperback 2005
 See review article: Max Pensky, “Choosing Your Mask”, New German Critique 63 (1994), 161-180
 Dialectic of Romanticism. A Critique of Modernism. With Peter Murphy, London: Continuum, 2004
 'Canetti’s Counter-Image of Society. Crowds, Power, Transformation. With Johann P. Arnason, 'Rochester, N.Y., Camden House, 2004.
 The Total Work of Art in European Modernism. Ithaca, NY: Cornell University Press, 2011 (Signale: Modern German Letters, Cultures, and Thought ed. Peter Hohendahl) See review article: Roger Fornoff, ‘At the Interface of Art, Religion, Politics‘, Thesis Eleven 123 (2014), 123-128.
 History of the Present: The Contemporary and its Culture. London, Routledge, 2021.
 Science Fiction and Narrative Form.'' With Andrew Milner and Peter Murphy, London, Bloomsbury, 2023.

References

1937 births
Living people
Australian philologists
Germanists
Monash University alumni
Academic staff of Monash University
Alumni of the University of Oxford
University of Cologne alumni
Fellows of the Australian Academy of the Humanities